The Old Rock School in Dodgeville, Wisconsin is a school that was built in 1853 and converted into a private house in 1882.  It was listed on the National Register of Historic Places in 1978.

It is a two-story building constructed of limestone rubble, with massive blocks of dressed limestone serving as quoins and lintels. It has a central chimney and a gable roof. The school was converted into a one-family house in the 1890s and into a multiple unit residence in the 1950s.

References

Buildings and structures in Iowa County, Wisconsin
School buildings on the National Register of Historic Places in Wisconsin
School buildings completed in 1853
National Register of Historic Places in Iowa County, Wisconsin